The 1896–97 Rugby Union County Championship was the ninth edition of England's premier rugby union club competition at the time.

Kent won the competition for the first time defeating Cumberland in the final. The Championship was subject to criticism regarding the lack of interest shown by some counties.

Final

See also
 English rugby union system
 Rugby union in England

References

Rugby Union County Championship
County Championship (rugby union) seasons